The County of Loon was a county in the Holy Roman Empire, which corresponded approximately with the Belgian province of Limburg. It was named after the original seat of its count, Loon, which is today called Borgloon. During the middle ages the counts moved their court to a more central position in Kuringen, which is today a part of Hasselt, the modern capital of the region.

From its beginnings, Loon was associated with the Prince-bishop of Liège and by 1190 the count had come under the bishop's overlordship. In the fourteenth century the male line ended for a second time, at which point the prince-bishops themselves took over the county directly. Loon approximately represented the Dutch-speaking (archaic ) part of the princedom. All of the Dutch-speaking towns in the Prince-Bishopric, with the status of being so-called "Good Cities", were in Loon, and are in Belgian Limburg today. These were  Beringen, Bilzen, Borgloon, Bree, Hamont, Hasselt, Herk-de-Stad, Maaseik, Peer and Stokkem.

Like other areas which eventually came under the power of the Prince Bishop of Liège, Loon never formally became part of the unified lordship of the "Low Countries" which united almost all of the Benelux in the late Middle Ages, and continued to unite almost all of today's Belgium under the ancien regime. Loon and other Liège lordships only joined their neighbours when they all became part of France during the French revolution. After the Battle of Waterloo, they remained connected in the new United Kingdom of the Netherlands. In 1839, the old territory of Loon became the approximate basis of a new province, Limburg, within the new Kingdom of Belgium.

Origins

From its earliest times as a county Loon had lordships in three distinct geographical areas which are also mentioned in early medieval administrative records. An eastern part of Loon was in the Maas river valley, the Frankish Maasau, on the western bank north of Maastricht, included Maaseik. The northeastern part of Loon was in the sandy Kempen region, which was often still referred to by the Roman term Texandria. The southern part was within the Dutch-speaking part of the fertile hills of Haspengouw which includes Borgloon itself.

Like many of the counties in the region, records mentioning counts of Loon begin in the early 11th century, but these give only indications of how the county came to be. The immediately preceding generations had seen many rebellions, confiscations, and expulsions. The larger region of Lower Lotharingia had been part of a separate kingdom, but it no longer had a king. The eastern and western kingdoms of the old Carolingian dynasty, the forerunners of later France and Germany, contested for control, together with the local magnates. By the year 1000, the area was under lasting control of the eastern kingdom, and not only Loon, but also other well-known counties such as Hainaut and Brabant, were developing into the forms known in the later Middle Ages. The 10th century history of these counties is now difficult to reconstruct. By 1000, royal power in the region was partly in the hands of the bishops of Liège, who had been granted important secular lordships.

In the early tenth century, at least until 939, it has traditionally been proposed (for example by Christophe Butkens, and much later Léon Vanderkindere) that the so-called Regnarid dynasty had controlled all or most of the region. In particular, a count named Rudolf, who was proposed to be the younger brother of Reginar III, had a county in the area of Maaseik in 952. This county of Rudolf, called Hufte or Huste in the two medieval documents which mention it, apparently included lands very close to Borgloon itself, according to a charter estimated to be from 958/959. Furthermore, a Count Rudolf, perhaps the same one, had also ruled a neighbouring county to the southwest of Borgloon, outside the future county of Loon, based in Avernas.

The Reginars suffered serious set-backs. In 939 their leader Duke Gilbert was killed. In 958 his nephew Reginar III was exiled, and although the two sons of Reginar III returned in 973, and began slowly establishing the power bases that eventually became the counties of Hainaut and Leuven, the fate of their proposed uncle Rudolf is unknown. However, Bishop Balderic II, brother of Count Gilbert of Loon, the first certain count, did have common ancestry with Lambert I, Count of Louvain, a descendant of the Reginarids.

According to the most widely accepted hypothesis, developed by Joseph Daris, Léon Vanderkindere, and up-dated by Jean Baerten and others, the counts of Loon, although related to the Regnarids, were actually members of the "Balderics family", descendants of Count Ricfrid. This family had strong links to the Ottonian dynasty in Germany while the Regnarids were seen as rebels, and two members of this family named Balderic (or Balderich, Palderih, etc.) had already held the powerful bishoprics in Utrecht and Liège at different times in the 10th century. Daris and Vanderkindere's proposal stemmed from the discovery of a marriage of a sister of the exile Reginar III with Count Nevelong, a son of Ricfrid, who is known to have had children named Rudolf, and Balderic I (Bishop of Liège 953-959). This family was therefore proposed as a link between Loon's origins and both the earlier Reginars who had apparently held lordships near Maaseik and Borgloon, as well as to two earlier bishops named Balderic.

Vanderkindere specifically proposed that Giselbert the first definite count of Loon was the son of the younger Count Rudolf, not the Regnarid, but his nephew the son of Nevelong. There have been chronological concerns raised about this unproven proposal, because the one record of Rudolf as a boy in 943 is so much earlier than any definite record of Count Giselbert and his brothers in the next century. Furthermore, the only medieval source to mention a parent for Count Giselbert calls him Otto. Although this source is not considered perfectly reliable for this period, Hein Jongbloed has proposed that a record for an Otto in Ghent might correspond to this ancestor. Van Winter on the other hand, has proposed that there may have been an Otto who was son of Rudolf, and father to the first count and his brothers.

Whoever his parents were, the first certain Count (Dutch graaf, Latin comes, French comte) of Loon was the 11th century Giselbert (modern Dutch Gijsbert, equivalent of modern English and French "Gilbert"). Exactly what territory he held is still uncertain, and his brother Arnulf is also mentioned as a count in various records. Although all of the charters which describe the brothers as siblings of bishop Balderic II of Liège are later forgeries, there is considered to be enough evidence to be accept this relationship.

A charter dated 24 Jan 1040 mentions a "county of Haspinga in the pagus Haspengouw", which had been the possession of count Arnold, understood to be the brother of Giselbert, also known as Arnulf. With this much debated charter Emperor Henry III granted this county to the Cathedral of Saint-Lambert in Liège. It raises the question of what this county within the pagus of the same name implied both geographically and legally. Furthermore, there is no record of Arnulf as count of Loon. Haspinga has been interpreted as being either the same as the county of Loon or as a lordship which held Loon under it (Baerten, and others), although it might simply have been one geographical part of Hesbaye, different to the one his brother held.

Connected to this open question, not only is the parentage of Giselbert, Arnulf and Balderic unknown, but also their connection to the next two count brothers, Emmo and Otto, is considered uncertain. They are thought to be the sons of either Giselbert or Arnulf. While Giselbert is the obvious proposal,  lean towards the position of Verhelst, and favor Arnulf as their father. A major argument for the position of Verhelst is that Emmo named his son and heir Arnulf/Arnold, and the name Giselbert was never used by his descendants. (Otto the brother of Emmo named his son Giselbert, but according to this proposal this name commemorates another Giselbert who was advocatus of St Truiden, as were both Otto and his son.)

Another important charter in discussions about the origins of the County of Loon is the 1078 grant by Countess Ermengarde to the Bishop of Liège, of allodial land in key places in the Count of Loon. Her possessions can not be explained by her proposed ancestry, or her known husband, and so it has long been suggested (for example by Vanderkindere, Baerten, and Kupper) that she must have first married a Count of Loon, normally presumed to be Arnold, because he is normally presumed to have had no heirs.

History
In the generation after the 3 brothers Balderic, Gilbert, and Arnulf, Count Emmo became the next count of Loon while his brother Count Otto was advocatus of the Abbey of St Truiden, and the ancestor of the first line of counts of Duras, perhaps through his wife Oda. The county of Duras was inherited by Otto's son Giselbert, and in turn by his son Otto. It eventually became part of Loon, under Count Gerard in the 1190s.

Count Arnold (or Arnulf) I, the son of Emmo, is according to Baerten (1969 p. 40), the first Count of Loon for whom we can discuss any political activity. In 1106 he was able to strengthen his position, when he acquired the possessions of the extinct Counts of Rieneck through his marriage. He also probably built the motte-and-bailey castle which was at Borgloon during the middle ages. His son Arnold II, Count of Loon, founded the Abbey of Averbode.

The son and heir of Arnold II was Louis (Dutch Lodewijk) I. He founded Averbode Abbey by charter dated 1135, and was count of Loon, Stadtgraf of Mainz, and count of Rieneck, both in modern Germany. He increased Loon's territory adding Kolmont (now in Tongeren) together with Bilzen. He strengthened the fort there and gave the city freedoms. He also did the same in Brustem (now in St Truiden), which came under threat as a Loon enclave surrounded by the County of Duras.

Count Gerard (sometimes incorrectly called Gerard "II"), the next count of Loon and Rieneck, fortified Brustem and Kolmont, and moved the capital of the county to Kuringen. There he founded Herkenrode Abbey, for women living according to the Cistercian rule. In Loon, the enduring conflict with his Liège overlords culminated in an 1179 campaign by Prince-Bishop Rudolf of Zähringen, whose troops devastated the county's capital at Borgloon in 1179. In 1193 he also acquired the county of Duras and advocacy of the abbey of Sint-Truiden, but had to accept Brabant's suzerainty over those lands. This area gave power over abbey lands in Sint-Truiden, Halen, and Herk de Stad, effectively defining what is today still the southwestern border of Belgian Limburg. Gerard's son Louis II was heir, but Rieneck went to another son, Gerard, Count of Rieneck. The counties of Rieneck and Loon were re-united eventually under Gerard of Rieneck's son Louis III of Loon, but he then divided them again, giving Loon to his brother Arnold IV.

By marriage, Count Arnold IV acquired the French-speaking County of Chiny in 1227, and brought the main line of the counts of Loon to the high point of its territorial expansion. The comital male line became extinct with the death of Louis IV of Loon in 1336 and the Loon and Chiny estates were at first inherited by the noble House of Sponheim at Heinsberg with the consent of the Liège bishop. In 1362 Prince-Bishop Engelbert III of the Marck nevertheless seized Loon and finally incorporated it into the Liège territory in 1366.

The county remained a separate entity (quartier) within Liège, whose prince-bishops assumed the comital title. When the bishopric was annexed by Revolutionary France in 1795, the county of Loon was also disbanded and an adjusted version of the territory became part of the French département of Meuse-Inférieure, along with Dutch Limburg to the east of the Maas. After the defeat of Napoleon, the département became part of the new United Kingdom of the Netherlands in 1815, and received its modern name of Limburg as a way for the kingdom to preserve the old title of the medieval Duchy of Limburg, which was nearby. However, in 1830, Belgium was created, splitting the Kingdom, and the position of Limburg and Luxemburg became a cause of conflict between the two resulting Kingdoms. In 1839, under international arbitration, it was finally decided to split Limburg and Luxemburg into their two modern parts. The western part of Limburg, corresponds roughly to the old County of Loon, and became part of Belgium. Both parts kept their new name of Limburg.

Counts of Loon
 Count Otto (doubted). Named as count of Loon in a much later St Truiden Abbey account of his son Baldric II's installation as Bishop of Liège in 1008. His existence is doubted, for example by Baerten.
 Giselbert (count at least 1015-1036), he and his brother Arnold were both referred to as counts in Haspengouw, and Giselbert was specifically referred to as count of Loon.
 Emmon (d.1078), clearly called "count of Loon" in own lifetime. His brother Otto, an advocate of the Abbey of Sint-Truiden was ancestor of the counts of Duras, but the brothers were collectively called counts of Loon in this generation. It is uncertain who the parents of the two brothers was.
 Arnold I (count at least 1090-1125), son of Emmo, married Agnes, daughter and heiress of Gerard, Burgrave of Mainz. (His contemporary, another Giselbert, the son of his uncle Otto, was count in Duras.)
 Arnold II (count in 1135), son of Arnold I. Founded Averbode Abbey.
 Louis I (1139–1171), son of Arnold II, married Agnes, daughter of Count Folmar V of Metz.
 Gerard (1171–1191), son, married Adelaide, daughter of Count Henry I of Guelders.
 Louis II (1191–1218), son, married Ada, daughter of Count Dirk VII of Holland, also Count of Holland 1203 - 1207, followed by his brothers as guardians of his minor nephews Louis III and Arnold IV:
 Henry (1218), another son of Gerard, died soon after.
 Arnold III (1218–1221), another son of Gerard, also Count of Rieneck, married Adelaide, daughter of Duke Henry I of Brabant.
 Louis III (1221–1227), grandson of Gerard, son of Gerard, Count of Rieneck, also Count of Rieneck 1221 - 1243, renounced Loon in favour of his younger brother.
 Arnold IV (1227–1273), another grandson of Gerard and son of Count Gerard of Rieneck, married Joanna, daughter of Louis IV the Younger, Count of Chiny, also Count of Chiny (as Arnold II)
 John I (1273–1279), son, married Matilda, daughter of William IV, Count of Jülich, secondly Isabelle de Condé
 Arnold V (1279–1323), son, also Count of Chiny 1299 - 1313, married Margaret of Vianden
 Louis IV (1323–1336), son, also Count of Chiny (as Louis VI) since 1313, married Margaret, daughter of Duke Theobald II of Lorraine
Male line extinct, succeeded by:
 Theodoric (or Diederik, or Thierry), (1336–1361) son of Gottfried of Sponheim, Lord of Heinsberg and Mechtild of Loon, sister of Count Louis IV, also Count of Chiny and Lord of Heinsberg.
 Gottfried (1361–1362), nephew, son of John of Heinsberg, married Philippa, daughter of Count William V of Jülich, also Count of Chiny and Lord of Heinsberg, sold the comital title to:
 Arnold VI of Rumigny (1362–1366), also Count of Chiny (as Arnold IV), claimant, renounced in favour of Liege,

Notes

References
 
 
 
 
 
 
 
 
 
 
 
 

 
Limburg (region)
Loon
Loon
1795 disestablishments
 
Hasselt